The 2018–19 Newcastle Jets W-League season was their eleventh season in the W-League, the premier competition for women's football in Australia. The team played home games at McDonald Jones Stadium and Newcastle Number 2 Sports Ground. The club's manager for the season was Craig Deans.

Players

Current squad
As of 26 November 2018

Transfers in

Transfers out

Pre-season and friendlies

W-League

League table

Fixtures

Results summary

Results by round

References

External links
 Official Website

Newcastle Jets FC (A-League Women) seasons